Richard Baughn (born June 9, 1958) is an American politician who served in the Alabama House of Representatives from the 14th district from 2010 to 2014.

References

1958 births
Living people
Republican Party members of the Alabama House of Representatives